The Battle of Xinzheng was fought between the forces of Chiang Kai-shek and Feng Yuxiang. Feng's army abandoned the neighboring city of Zhengzhou as a result. The 11th Division of the National Revolutionary Army was the first to enter the city, followed by the 47th Division and 48th Division.

Bibliography
中華民國國防大學編，《中國現代軍事史主要戰役表》

Conflicts in 1930